Some Mothers Do 'Ave 'Em is a play by Guy Unsworth based on the BBC TV sitcom of the same name by Raymond Allen.

Production history 
The play premiered at the Wyvern Theatre in Swindon on 21 February 2018 before embarking on a UK tour. The production was directed by Unsworth, designed by Simon Higlett, scenery built by Splinter Scenery and starred Joe Pasquale as Frank Spencer, Sarah Earnshaw as Betty Spencer and Susie Blake as Mrs Fisher.

The playtext was published on 19 July 2018 by Samuel French, Inc.

Due to the success of the 2018 tour, the production began another tour with Pasquale, Earnshaw and Blake reprising their roles, however was forced to stop due to the COVID-19 pandemic. The tour recommenced in March 2022, with James Paterson joining as Father O'Hara.

Cast and characters

Reception 
The play received critical acclaim earning four and five stars across many reviews.

External links 

 Official website

References 

2018 plays
Plays based on television series
British plays